HMS Fowey was a sixth-rate warship of the Royal Navy. Built in 1749, the ship was sunk in action with the French during the Siege of Yorktown in 1781. 
Mark Robinson was appointed to the Fowey, a 6th Rate of 24 guns,  on the 13th June 1767, at Sheerness, and sailed via Spithead, to Plymouth, and thence to Madeira in September, and on to the East Coast of the American colonies, arriving at Charleston in  28 October 1767, relieving the Sardoine.
“Pennsylvania Gazetter December 1767
Nov. 6. Captain Mark Robinson, of his Majesty ship Fowey, of 28 guns, who arrived here last week from Great Britain, is commanding officer, or Commodore of all his Majesty’s ships from Virginia to Cape Florida, including the Bahama Islands. Commodore Hood, stationed at Halifax, commands as far south as New York, and, it is said, a third Commodore will be stationed at Virginia.”
The itinerary of the Fowey, with Mark Robinson in command was Charleston in 1768, Rebellion Roads (July 1768), Charleston, Sandy Hook, Louisburg (October 1768, Halifax, Charleston (January 1769) Cape Fear Charleston, Fort Royal (June 1769), Charleston, Halifax, Charleston, leaving the Fowey on the 31st January 1771. (ADM 36/ 7374)
Mark Robinson believed that the small coasting  vessels engaged  in  a  great  deal of  smuggling,  and  he  asked  the Admiralty  to buy a tender to examine creeks and  islets  (15 November 1767 ADM1/2388). He was put straight by the  Merchants of South Carolina on the matter of intra-colony trade, after the Sardoine  and Captain Hawker affair, and was asked not to  stop interior  trade. He seems to have heeded that advice, as  there is  no record that he seized any coasting vessels while he  was in  South  Carolina.  
On the 29th April 1770 Sir William Draper embarked in the Fowey, to visit Governor Tryon at the Cape Fear.
Mark Robinson on the Fowey is also stated as having arrived in Charles Town 8 October 1770, from Virginia and sailed for Virginia again on the 29 January 1771.
Whilst he was on this coast  he  had  the satisfaction  of  preserving Charleston from the effects  of  an alarming  conflagration, a service for which the  Merchants  of South  Carolina expressed their gratitude by a public  vote  of thanks, dated the 14th January 1771. He sailed from Charleston on the 22 (29) January 1771. 
Her Captain on 1 January 1775 is listed as Cpt. Geo Montagu. The ship is noted as having received Lord Dunmore, the governor of the Colony of Virginia, when he fled the colony for safety after the Gunpowder Incident during the beginning of the American Revolution, marking the last departure of a Royal Governor from the colony, effectively ending British rule in Virginia. The National Park Service has identified it as a probable candidate for a wreck located off Yorktown, Virginia, in the York River.

References

1749 ships
Frigates of the Royal Navy
Maritime incidents in 1781